Thendral is a 2004 Indian Tamil-language drama film directed by Thangar Bachan and produced by Venu Ravichandran. The film stars Parthiban and Uma, with Rajashree in a pivotal role. It was released on 6 February 2004.

Plot
In opening scene,we see a man walking towards a grave in middle of farmland and lighting up lamp and keeping food in banana leaf.
He slowly places his head on grave.

The film slowly moves back to 1989,Nalangili
(Parthiban) is a reputed writer with revolutionary mindset. He even refuses to take the sahitya award 
and instead asks the president to provide justice to tamilnadu on cauvery issue.Thamarai aka Thamaraichelvi (Uma) is a huge fan of Nalangili and harbours a secret crush on him. She lives with her mother in a hut in aynavaram, madras where they provide milk to neighbor homes to earn a living.
Nalangili also lives in same locality. Venkatrama iyer (Madhan Bob) lives next to nalangili's house and is annoyed by his actions.

One day,Nalangili interferes in temple kumbabishekam in the locality and is arrested. In prison, he comes across (Raghava Lawrence) who is on death Row for a false case on him.He narrates to Nalangili that his father and him used to be parai artists in his village and his father lost his hand in an altercation with a caste hindu.
Meanwhile Thamarai's mother dies in a fire accident and she is adopted by her relative family. They plan to marry her to their son.

She escapes to tiruchirapalli but is accidentally trafficked to Nalangili. But he mistakes her to a prostitute and sleeps with her giving her money thinking she is a callgirl. Soon she moves to palani.She gives birth to a boy and names him valavan (Aravind Bachan) and raises him in pazhanii. Valavan occasionally ask for his father but thamarai doesnot reveal it.
One day the boys in his locality tease him on his birth.He hits them with stone and runs away.
He manages to stumble across Nalangili and stays with him. They slowly bond with each other.One day Valavan and Nalangili fight with each other due to Nalangili bringing in prostitutes.

Valavan disappears and Nalangili tries to find him. Thamarai comes to Madras and searches for him.
Finally Nalangili and Valavan go to pazhanii. Nalangili finds out from thamarai's diary that he is the biological father of Valavan.
He also understands her love for him.

Thamarai meanwhile falls into sewer and slowly passes away in hospital.She tells Valavan that Nalangili is his father.Nalangili decides to live for Valavan.

Cast
Parthiban as Nalangili
Uma as Thamaraichelvi
 Ranjini Pradeep as Thamaraichelvi (younger)
Swathi as Sundari
Aravind Bachan as Killi Vallavan
Ravichandran as Singara Velu Nayagar
Ramesh Khanna as Sundarakanth
Madhan Bob as Venkatrama Iyer
Raghava Lawrence in a special appearance
Priyanka as Callgirl

Production
Thangar Bachan had initially approached Karthik to play the lead role in the film, but the actor turned it down.

Soundtrack

The music was composed by Vidyasagar.

Release
The film won positive reviews, with a critic noting "the movie moves on without the usual cinematic trends at the start but to make the movie interesting, in the end, the director makes use of those trends. Yet, Thendral has jointly touched the audience with its absorbing story."

References

External links

 

2004 films
2000s Tamil-language films
Films scored by Vidyasagar
Films directed by Thangar Bachan